Mun Kyong-nam (born 8 April 1989) is a North Korean footballer. He represented North Korea on at least two occasions in 2008.

Career statistics

International

References

1989 births
Living people
North Korean footballers
North Korea international footballers
Association football defenders
Amnokgang Sports Club players